Big Shot is an American sports comedy-drama television series created by David E. Kelley, Dean Lorey and Brad Garrett for Disney+ starring John Stamos, Jessalyn Gilsig, and Yvette Nicole Brown.

The series premiered on April 16, 2021. In September 2021, the series was renewed for a second season, which premiered on October 12, 2022. In February 2023, the series was cancelled after two seasons.

Premise
The series follows Marvyn Korn, a temperamental basketball coach who is fired from his job at the University at Wisconsin and relocates to California to coach a girls’ basketball team at Westbrook School, an elite high school for girls.

Cast and characters

Main

 John Stamos as Marvyn Korn, a temperamental basketball coach who coaches at Westbrook School for Girls in San Diego, California
 Jessalyn Gilsig as Holly Barrett, the Westbrook Sirens' good natured down-to-earth assistant coach and a biology teacher at the school
 Richard Robichaux as George Pappas (season 1), the school counselor at Westbrook School for Girls
 Sophia Mitri Schloss as Emma Korn, Marvyn's teenage daughter
 Nell Verlaque as Louise Gruzinsky, the Westbrook Sirens' star player and point guard. The school's gym was named after her family.
 Tiana Le as Destiny Winters, the Westbrook Sirens' power forward. Because she lost her father several years ago, she forms a bond with Coach Korn.
 Monique Green as Olive Cooper (season 1), a Westbrook Sirens player who is obsessed with using social media. She doesn't come from a wealthy family.
 Tisha Eve Custodio as Carolyn "Mouse" Smith, a Westbrook Sirens' player who comes from a military background
 Cricket Wampler as Samantha Finkman, the Westbrook Sirens' shooting guard
 Yvette Nicole Brown as Sherilyn Thomas, the no-nonsense dean of Westbrook School for Girls
 Sara Echeagaray as Ava (season 2), a former star volleyball player who comes to Westbrook after washing out of her sport in a manner similar to Coach Korn

Recurring

 Toks Olagundoye as Terri Grint (season 1), a political science teacher at Westbrook School for Girls who values academics over sports
 Emery Kelly as Dylan (season 1), Louise's best friend
 Darcy Rose Byrnes as Harper Schapira, an intense journalist at the school, Miss Goodwyn's daughter, and Mouse's love interest
 Dale Whibley as Lucas, Louise's older brother and Emma's initial love interest
 Kathleen Rose Perkins as Miss Goodwyn (season 1), the drama teacher and drama club advisor at Westbrook School for Girls and Harper's mother
 Daisha Graf as Angel (season 1), Destiny's aunt who is secretly her biological mother
 Damian Alonso as Jake Matthews (season 1), a Carlsbad Cobras player and Olive's love interest
 Camryn Manheim as Coach McCarthy, the head coach of Westbrook Sirens' rival team Carlsbad Cobras
 Keala Settle as Christina Winters (season 1), Destiny's mother who is actually her aunt
 Charlie Hall as Nick Russo (season 2) Louise and Ava's love interest. His family went bankrupt due to the embezzling of Louise's father, Larry Gruzinski.
 Samuel-Taylor as Trevor Thomas (season 2), Sherilyn's son and Destiny's love interest
 Stony Blyden as Jackson Hoover (season 2), Emma's love interest, who turns out to be a bad influence as he constantly gets her into trouble for his actions

Special guest stars
 Tony Kornheiser as himself (season 1)
 Michael Wilbon as himself (season 1)
 Stan Verrett as himself (season 2)

Episodes

Series overview

Season 1 (2021)

Season 2 (2022)

Production

Development 
In October 2019, Disney+ ordered a ten-episode hour-long dramedy based on an original idea by Brad Garrett, who pitched the idea to David E. Kelley and developed it along with Dean Lorey. The trio along with Bill D'Elia were to executive produce with ABC Signature acting as the Production house. Lorey was to write the script and D'Elia to direct the first episode. On September 2, 2021, Disney+ renewed the series for a second season. On February 17, 2023, Disney+ cancelled the series after two seasons.

Casting 
With the announcement of the series in October 2019 it was revealed that John Stamos had been cast in the lead role. In late October, the casting of the series regulars were released, attaching Shiri Appleby as assistant coach and Yvette Nicole Brown as dean of the school, along with Richard Robichaux as George, Sophia Mitri Schloss as Emma, Nell Verlaque as Louise, Tiana Le as Destiny, Monique Green as Olive Cooper, Tisha Custodio as Carolyn "Mouse" Smith, and Cricket Wampler as Samantha Finkman. In late January 2020, it was revealed that Jessalyn Gilsig had replaced Shiri Appleby as Holly to make the character a contemporary to Stamos' role. On November 19, 2020, Keala Settle and Emery Kelly were cast in recurring roles. On April 30, 2021, Camryn Manheim, Daisha Graf, and Dale Whibley were cast in recurring roles. On May 13, 2021, it was reported that Darcy Rose Byrnes was set to recur while Marla Gibbs was cast to guest star. On August 15, 2022, Charlie Hall joined the cast in a recurring capacity for the second season.

Filming 
Principal photography for Big Shot began in November 2019 in Los Angeles. In March 2020, production was suspended due to the COVID-19 pandemic. Production for the series also shut down for a day in November after a COVID-19 test that resulted in being a negative, and for the rest of 2020 in December after a COVID-19 test that resulted in being a positive. Filming resumed in early January 2021, but was paused again at the end of the month after a second positive COVID-19 test. Filming then resumed two weeks later. Production for the second season began in early 2022.

Release
The series premiered on April 16, 2021, releasing weekly on Fridays. The second season was released on October 12, 2022.

Reception

Critical response 
Review aggregator Rotten Tomatoes reported an approval rating of 78% based on 23 critic reviews, with an average rating of 6.6/10. The website's critics consensus reads, "Big Shot struggles to find much new to say, but it boasts strong performances, a sweet disposition, and, with a little perseverance, could become a show worth rooting for." Metacritic gave the series a weighted average score of 65 out of 100 based on 11 critic reviews, indicating "generally favorable reviews."

Jen Chaney of Vulture appreciated the series for its depiction of a basketball team composed of female players instead of male players, stating it portrays some of the obstacles women can face in sport, and complimented the performances of the cast, especially John Stamos and Tiana Le's, while giving a positive take on the development of Stamos' character through his relationships. Daniel Fienberg of The Hollywood Reporter appreciated the show for its avoidance of easy punchlines by not providing clichés compared to some other sitcoms, praised the characterization and development of Stamos' character, while complimenting performances of the cast and the chemistry between the characters, but stated that the series does not develop some characters enough. Joel Keller of Decider praised the performances of the cast, especially Stamos, stating the actor manages to provide the mannerisms of an intense coach, while saying that the series stays well written despite being predictable at times. Joyce Slaton of Common Sense Media rated the series 4 out of 5 stars, praised the depiction of positive messages, such as perseverance and teamwork, and complimented the presence of positive role models, citing with John Stamos and Jessalyn Gilsi's characters for the advice and lessons they provide to other characters. Pradeep Menon of Firstpost rated the series 3 out of 5 stars, found the show refreshing for its quick resolution of dramatic moments, complimented the performances of the cast members, and appreciated the depiction of same-sex romance as regular relationships. Kristen Lopez of IndieWire gave the show a C+ rating, praised the performances of the cast members, especially Stamos, and complimented Big Shot for avoiding clichés, but found that the series does not develop some characters enough, while stating that the script sometimes feels old-fashioned.

Accolades

References

External links 

 
 

2020s American comedy-drama television series
2020s American high school television series
2020s American teen drama television series
2021 American television series debuts
2022 American television series endings
2020s American LGBT-related television series
American sports television series
Basketball television series
Disney+ original programming
English-language television shows
Television productions suspended due to the COVID-19 pandemic
Television series by ABC Studios
Television series created by David E. Kelley
Television shows filmed in Los Angeles
Television shows set in San Diego